Vienna Township is a civil township of Montmorency County in the U.S. state of Michigan. The population was 572 at the 2010 census.

Geography
According to the United States Census Bureau, the township has a total area of 69.3 square miles (179.5 km), of which 69.0 square miles (178.8 km) is land and 0.3 square miles (0.7 km) (0.38%) is water.

Demographics
At the 2000 census, there were 572 people, 233 households and 171 families residing in the township. The population density was 8.3 per square mile (3.2/km). There were 559 housing units at an average density of 8.1 per square mile (3.1/km). The racial makeup of the township was 98.43% White, 0.17% Native American, and 1.40% from two or more races. Hispanic or Latino of any race were 0.35% of the population.

There were 233 households, of which 26.2% had children under the age of 18 living with them, 63.5% were married couples living together, 4.7% had a female householder with no husband present, and 26.6% were non-families. 23.2% of all households were made up of individuals, and 8.2% had someone living alone who was 65 years of age or older. The average household size was 2.45 and the average family size was 2.90.

24.1% of the population were under the age of 18, 5.9% from 18 to 24, 23.3% from 25 to 44, 30.8% from 45 to 64, and 15.9% who were 65 years of age or older. The median age was 43 years. For every 100 females, there were 108.8 males. For every 100 females age 18 and over, there were 107.7 males.

The median household income was $35,909, and the median family income was $42,222. Males had a median income of $27,188 versus $18,375 for females. The per capita income for the township was $18,923. About 7.7% of families and 11.6% of the population were below the poverty line, including 23.8% of those under age 18 and 11.7% of those age 65 or over.

References

Townships in Montmorency County, Michigan
Townships in Michigan